Sanjaya Ranaweera can refe to:

 Sanjaya Ranaweera (cricketer, born 1981), a Sri Lankan cricketer
 Sanjaya Ranaweera (cricketer, born 1986), a Sri Lankan cricketer